The 1947–48 Kansas Jayhawks men's basketball team represented the University of Kansas during the 1947–48 college men's basketball season.

Roster
Otto Schnellbacher
Eugene Barr
Gilbert Stramel
Jack Eskridge
John Dewell
Myron Enns
Guy Mabry
Jerry Waugh
Claude Houchin
William Sapp
Charles Penny
Maurice Martin
Harold England

Schedule

References

Kansas Jayhawks men's basketball seasons
Kansas
Kansas
Kansas